Ca din tulnic is a unique type of doina in which the melody resembles a type of Alpenhorn called the tulnic.

References

Romanian music